Yoko Yagi (born 14 April 1980) is a Japanese long-distance runner.

She finished fourteenth at the 2005 World Half Marathon Championships, which was good enough to help Japan finish third in the team competition.

Personal bests
5000 metres - 15:51.45 min (2004)
10,000 metres - 32:09.95 min (2005)
Half marathon - 1:10:06 hrs (2006)

References

1980 births
Living people
Japanese female long-distance runners
Place of birth missing (living people)
20th-century Japanese women
21st-century Japanese women